Bromazolam (XLI-268) is a triazolobenzodiazepine (TBZD) which was first synthesised in 1976, but was never marketed. It has subsequently been sold as a designer drug, first being definitively identified by the EMCDDA in Sweden in 2016. It is the bromo instead of chloro analogue of alprazolam and has similar sedative and anxiolytic effects to it and other benzodiazepines. Bromazolam is a non subtype selective agonist at the benzodiazepine site of GABAA receptors, with a binding affinity of 2.81nM at the α1 subtype, 0.69nM at α2 and 0.62nM at α5.

See also 
 Clobromazolam
 Flualprazolam
 Flubromazolam
 Pyrazolam
 Triazolam

References 

Triazolobenzodiazepines
Designer drugs
GABAA receptor positive allosteric modulators